Scott Lawson (born 28 September 1981 in Lanark) is a Scottish rugby union player who plays club rugby for Newcastle Falcons.

Lawson started playing rugby with Biggar RFC he went through the youth system and all the way to the first XV. He then moved to sign and play for the Glasgow Pro' team.

He played for Gloucester Rugby after moving from Sale Sharks in September 2008. After four years, Lawson left Gloucester in 2012 and joined London Irish on a two-year contract. But on 22 April 2013 it was announced Lawson would join newly promoted Newcastle Falcons in the Aviva Premiership for the 2013–14 season.

He plays internationally for Scotland. He plays as a hooker. Lawson scored a try during his 12th cap for Scotland in 2007, in a match against . He was selected for the 2007 World Cup, and scored a try against  in Scotland's opening match .

References

External links
Gloucester profile
Sale profile
scrum.com stats
Profile at rugbyworldcup.com

1981 births
Living people
Biggar RFC players
Glasgow Warriors players
Gloucester Rugby players
London Irish players
Rugby union hookers
Rugby union players from Lanark
Sale Sharks players
Scotland international rugby union players
Scottish rugby union players
Newcastle Falcons players